The Dr. Stuart House, also known as Verduzco Residence, is a house built in 1887 in Dayton, Oregon.  It was listed on the National Register of Historic Places in 1987. A new house was built on the site in 2008.

References

National Register of Historic Places in Yamhill County, Oregon
Buildings and structures in Dayton, Oregon
Houses in Yamhill County, Oregon
1887 establishments in Oregon